The Janesville Free Public Library is the public library in Janesville, Minnesota, United States.  It is housed in a Carnegie library building constructed in 1912.  It is part of the Waseca-Le Sueur Regional Library System, which is a participant in the Traverse des Sioux Library System.  The Janesville library building was listed on the National Register of Historic Places in 1982 for its local significance in the themes of architecture and educaction.  It was nominated for being a well-preserved example of the 65 libraries founded in Minnesota by Andrew Carnegie's philanthropy, and for its Neoclassical architecture.

See also
 List of Carnegie libraries in Minnesota
 National Register of Historic Places listings in Waseca County, Minnesota

References

External links
 Waseca-Le Sueur Library System

1912 establishments in Minnesota
Buildings and structures in Waseca County, Minnesota
Carnegie libraries in Minnesota
Education in Waseca County, Minnesota
Libraries on the National Register of Historic Places in Minnesota
Library buildings completed in 1912
National Register of Historic Places in Waseca County, Minnesota
Neoclassical architecture in Minnesota
Public libraries in Minnesota